The 2001 Asian Badminton Championships was the 20th edition of the Asian Badminton Championships. It was held in PhilSports Arena, Manila, Philippines from August 21 to August 26, 2001.

Medalists

Medal table

Finals

Semifinals

References

External links
 Draws and results - BadmintonAsia.org (.xls)

Badminton Asia Championships
Asian Badminton Championships
B
Asian Championships